Åsa Elvik (born 12 January 1979 in Bø, Nordland) is a Norwegian politician for the Socialist Left Party (SV). She was elected to the Norwegian Parliament from Nordland in 2001.

She was a member of the Nordland county council from 1999-2001.

Parliamentary committee duties 
2005 - 2009 member of the Standing Committee on Local Government and Public Administration.
2005 - 2009 deputy member of the Electoral Committee.
2001 - 2005 member of the Standing Committee on Business and Industry.
2001 - 2005 member of the Electoral Committee.

External links

1979 births
Living people
Socialist Left Party (Norway) politicians
Women members of the Storting
Members of the Storting
21st-century Norwegian politicians
21st-century Norwegian women politicians
People from Bø, Nordland